Carystus phorcus is a species of butterfly in the family Hesperiidae. It is found in South America.

Subspecies
Carystus phorcus phorcus - Surinam, Brazil (Amazonas)
Carystus phorcus claudianus (Latreille, [1824]) - Brazil

References

Butterflies described in 1777
Hesperiinae